The J. H. Hawes Elevator is a historic grain elevator located on 2nd Street in Atlanta, Illinois. The elevator was built in 1903 along the Illinois Midland Railroad; it was used to store locally farmed grain before the railroad shipped it to cities such as Peoria, Decatur, and Terre Haute, Indiana. Built by McIntyre and Wykle, the elevator is an example of a studded grain elevator, which uses vertical wooden studs in its walls to form its internal grain bins. The elevator operated until 1975. It was later restored to its original condition and is now a museum.

The elevator was added to the National Register of Historic Places on May 17, 1991. It is the only restored wooden grain elevator on the National Register in Illinois.

References

External links 
 Description at Illinois Route 66.com

Agricultural buildings and structures on the National Register of Historic Places in Illinois
Buildings and structures in Logan County, Illinois
Grain elevators in the United States
Museums in Logan County, Illinois
Farm museums in Illinois
Industry museums in Illinois
Agricultural buildings and structures on the National Register of Historic Places
National Register of Historic Places in Logan County, Illinois
Agricultural buildings and structures in Illinois